The Indian Institute of Infrastructure and Construction Kollam or IIIC-Kollam is a public institute of international standard situated at Chavara in Kollam, Kerala. The initiative has been undertaken by the Government of Kerala with the support of the Government of India. The academy is coming under the Kerala Academy for Skills Excellence (KASE) to support the skill development programmes for construction related occupations

History
The construction academy was first proposed by the LDF ministry during 2008. They started the background works for the academy and named the project as Kerala Construction Academy, proposed at Chathannoor in Kollam district. When UDF came into power, they have shifted the project from Chathannoor to chavara and renamed as Indian Institute of Infrastructure and Construction.

Campus

The institute is on a  campus along the NH-66, near chavara in Kollam Metropolitan Area. Foundation stone was laid by the then Chief Minister of Kerala Mr. Oommen Chandy on 15 March 2013. The campus was inaugurated for academic activities by the Hon. Chief Minister Shri. Pinarayi Vijayan in August 2018.

Courses
During the initial phase, there will be three technician and managerial level courses along with a course in supervisory level. There will be an advanced certificate programme also in plumbing engineering. Candidates with SSLC, Plus Two, ITI, diploma, degree and B.Tech qualification can join for the courses.

Significance 
Kerala state depends on migrant workers for the various jobs needed. The dependence on Migrant labourers in Kerala is found mainly in the field of construction. The city of Kollam and other places like Punalur, Paravur in Kollam district, Perumbavoor, Thrissur etc. are slowly becoming overwhelmed with a number of migrants from North India. The migrant labours in places like Kollam have started scoring top marks in literacy equivalent examination. So an institute for developing the unskilled domestic labours as well as migrant labourers has become an essential need in Kerala. The main aim behind this institute is to train masons to upgrade their skills and get a certification from the Britain-based organisation City and Guilds.

The flagship project of KASE is the Centre of Excellence in Construction and Infrastructure by the name Indian Institute of Infrastructure and Construction (IIIC). Established in a 9-acre state-of the-art campus at Chavara, Kollam District, Kerala, the objectives of IIIC are broadly to:

 Establish a world class Skill Centre, as centre of excellence, for imparting international quality skill sets to the personnel in construction industry of all cadres, right from the labourers to the top managerial personnel under three major categories viz., technician, supervisory and managerial categories.
 Maximize the reach of the Skill Centre in terms of capacity intake as well as sub sectors covered and the area of reach. 
 Obtain high recognition for the courses of the Skill Centre across the globe 
 Ensure maximum employment through linking the courses with employment wide industrial tie ups
 Offer courses in emerging areas of skill development and entrepreneurship

In May 2018, The Kerala Academy for Skills Excellence(KASE) decide to partner with The Uralungal Labour Contract Society Ltd(ULCCS) to collaborate in courses offered at IIIC-Kollam under KASE. An MoU in this regard is signed on 30 May in the presence of Labour and Excise Minister for Kerala, T. P. Ramakrishnan.

Project details of IIIC-Kollam
 Total area - 9.02 acre
 Total built up space - 235102 square feet 
 Blocks - Administrative Block, Training block, Canteen, Substation etc.
 Total estimated project cost - Rs. 100 Crores
 Main Building - 1.5 lakh square feet, 38 classrooms, 10 office rooms, canteen etc.
 Hostel Building - 35,000 square feet, 54 rooms, Canteen etc.

Facilities

 Eco-friendly campus with the usage of bio-degradable materials.
 Plastic free campus from the inception itself.
 LED-based street and external lighting systems using photovoltaics
 30% of the cooking gas requirements are satisfied through bio-gas plants
 Rainwater harvesting systems are installed to save water from wastage
 Residential campus with modern and homely hostels
 Sewage treatment plant
 Classrooms with multimedia facilities
 Canteen
 Central Library
 Language Lab
 Transportation facility
 Emergency medical care.
 Bank Counter & ATM
 Guest House.
 Staff Quarters

References

Education in Kollam
Labour ministries
Internal migration in India
Labour in India
Organisations based in Kollam
2018 establishments in Kerala
Educational institutions established in 2018
State agencies of Kerala